KCR is a clinical development provider for the biotechnology and pharmaceutical industries. It has three main service areas: Trial Execution, Consulting and Placement.

KCR operates across four main regions: North America, Western Europe, Central Europe, and Eastern Europe, with a main operational hub located in Boston, MA, and other hubs in Berlin, Germany, Warsaw, Poland, Kyiv, Ukraine and Sydney, Australia respectively. KCR employs over 700 staff.

History 
KCR was established in 1997 as Kiecana Clinical Research. The company provided services for clinical monitoring, clinical project management, safety/pharmacovigilance, regulatory affairs and quality assurance..

In April 2014, KCR launched KCR Placement, which offers recruitment and outsourcing for pharma and biotech in Europe. In 2017, KCR opened its headquarters in Boston, US.
 
In 2017, KCR, launched an NGO called Human Behind Every Number which provides research, insight and education on the first-hand experiences of patients involved in clinical trials. In March 2018, KCR and The Story, received an iF Design Award for their work on the NGO's website.

As of 2020, KCR employs over 700 life science professionals and offers end-to-end study execution and consulting services in oncology, immunology, CNS and vaccines.

References

External links 
 

 
Clinical trial organizations
Pharmaceutical industry